Victor Stange Lind (born 12 July 2003) is a Danish professional footballer who plays for IFK Norrköping, on loan from FC Midtjylland.

Club career 
Lind was born in Løgumkloster and was part of the SønderjyskE academy, before moving to FC Midtjylland in 2018.

He made his professional debut for Midtjylland on the 28 July 2021, coming on as a substitute during the Champions League qualifying 2–1 home win against Celtic, that saw them reach the next round. On 29 January 2023, Lind joined Swedish club IFK Norrköping on a year-long loan deal.

References

External links

2003 births
Living people
Danish men's footballers
Danish expatriate men's footballers
Association football forwards
People from Tønder Municipality
Denmark youth international footballers
Sportspeople from the Region of Southern Denmark
FC Midtjylland players
Hamarkameratene players
IFK Norrköping players
Danish Superliga players
Eliteserien players
Danish expatriate sportspeople in Norway
Danish expatriate sportspeople in Sweden
Expatriate footballers in Norway
Expatriate footballers in Sweden